Shock is the fifth studio album by new wave band The Motels.  It was recorded during 1984 and 1985, and released in August 1985.  It sold approximately 400,000 copies in the United States.

Singles released from this album include the American Top 30 hit, "Shame," and its follow-up, "Shock", as well as an Australia-only release, "Icy Red", that did not chart.  "Shame" reached No. 21  on Billboard's Hot 100. Both songs were aided by popular music videos.

Martha Davis was inspired to write "Shame" by affairs depicted on various soap operas.

Track listing

Singles

Personnel
Credits are taken from the cassette's liner notes.

The Motels
Martha Davis – vocals, rhythm guitar
Guy Perry (aka Adrian Peritore) – lead guitar
Marty Jourard – keyboards, saxophone
Michael Goodroe – bass
Brian Glascock – drums, percussion
Scott Thurston – keyboards, guitar

Additional personnel
Arthur Barrow – fretless bass on "Icy Red"

Production
Credits are taken from the cassette's liner notes.
Produced by Richie Zito
Engineered by Michael Frondelli, Mick Guzauski, David Leonard
Additional recordings by Dave Connors
Assistant engineering by Sam Taylor, Peter Doell
Mixing engineered by Michael Frondelli
Additional synthesizer programming by Arthur Barrow, Gary Chang
Art direction by Roy Kohara
Design by John O'Brien
Photography/illustration by Tony Viramontes

Charts

Notes

References

1985 albums
The Motels albums
Albums produced by Richie Zito
Capitol Records albums